Auckland Anniversary Day is a public holiday observed in the northern half of the North Island of New Zealand, being the area's provincial anniversary day. It is observed throughout the historic Auckland Province, even though the provinces of New Zealand were abolished in 1876. The modern area of observation consists of all of the Northland (where it is known as Northland Day), Auckland, Waikato, Bay of Plenty and Gisborne regions, as well as some parts of the Manawatū-Whanganui and Hawke's Bay regions north of the 39th parallel. The holiday falls on the Monday closest to 29 January, the anniversary of the arrival of William Hobson, later the first Governor of New Zealand, in the country in 1840.

History
Auckland Anniversary Day was established by Governor Hobson's direction, over Willoughby Shortland's signature, in 1842. The New Zealand Government Gazette of 26 January 1842 (Volume 2, 4th edition) carried a notice stating, 

The choice of 29 January appeared strange, as Hobson himself pronounced that it was on the following day that he proclaimed British Sovereignty in New Zealand. 30 January 1840 was the day that the Union Jack was flown on the masthead of the Herald, the ship that brought Hobson to the Bay of islands, and that the flag was saluted by guns. By all accounts, 30 January should have been chosen for the anniversary day.

In 1841, there was no capacity for arranging anniversary celebrations, as the national capital was in the process of being shifted from Okiato to Auckland. In 1842, 30 January fell on a Sunday. These days holidays are sometimes being "Mondayised" and the Auckland anniversary day was "Saturdayised" when it was created in 1842.

Daniel Pollen, who was Premier in 1875–1876 and a member of the Legislative Council, was determined to have this inaccuracy rectified. Upon his request, a joint committee of the Legislative Council and the House of Representatives was tasked to prepare a report. On 11 September 1894, the committee's report recommended for the anniversary date to be shifted to 30 January, and that it apply as an anniversary of all of New Zealand, as it was the founding of the nation. The Liberal Government, however, saw no need to change any of the existing arrangements.

Events
The Auckland Anniversary Regatta, the largest single-day regatta in the world, takes place on this holiday.

Since 2011, Auckland Anniversary Day has been the first day that state and state integrated schools outside of the former Auckland Province can open for the year (the last day being 7 February). However, as schools are not permitted to open on public holidays, schools in the former Auckland Province cannot open until the day after.

References

Anniversaries
Public holidays in New Zealand
January observances
February observances
Auckland Region
1842 establishments in New Zealand
Summer events in New Zealand